Genevieve Rogers, born in Louisville, Kentucky on April 9, 1859, was a stage actress who began her career when she was four-years-old. Her father, J. Howard Rogers, was a well-known scenic artist of the time and her mother also held a prominent position in theatre before her retirement.

Early life and career 

Her first appearance on the stage was in The Enchantress at the Howard Athenaeum in Boston, Massachusetts; a grand operatic drama where she played the role of a child, working alongside Miss Caroline Richings; the star. She continued acting at the Howard Athenaeum, playing the roles of different child characters, until 1868, when she was granted the role of little Arthur Leigh in Rosedale and performed at the Boston Museum. Throughout the same season, she played as Puck in A Midsummer Night's Dream in a long run at the Continental Theatre, along with getting her education at the Dudley School, where, according to her teachers, she did very well.

In 1869 she moved with her parents to Chicago, Illinois and completed her education.

In April 1875, she returned once again to the stage, though this time under the management of Frank E. Aiken, one of the leading stage managers of Chicago for several years. Mr. Aiken's reputation allowed her access to the theatres of other managers around the United States, which eventually resulted in the adoration of her presence in them.

From 1875-6, she acted as a wide range of characters, some of the most prominent being Kate Calvert in The Virginian, Juliana in The Honeymoon, Parthenia in Ingomar, Peg Woffington in Masks and Faces, Hester Arncliffe in An Unequal Match, Grace Holden in Grace Holden's Secret.

In September 1876, she acted as the title character in Maud Miller, and with that role continued to act in all of the major cities in the country at the time.

In March 1877, she returned to her first venue, the Boston Museum, and played there for the first time since her early childhood.

Under a five-year contract with Frank E. Aiken from April 1875, she proceeded to strengthen her repertoire.

Later life and career

References

1859 births
Date of death missing
People from Louisville, Kentucky
19th-century American actresses
American stage actresses